Matthew Walter Forde (born 29 April 2002) is a Barbadian cricketer. He plays for St Lucia Kings in the Caribbean Premier League and for Dambulla Aura in the Lanka Premier League.

Career 
He made his T20 debut on 1 September 2022 for St Lucia Kings against Trinbago Knight Riders in the 2022 Caribbean Premier League. He made his List A debut on 31 October 2022 for Combined Campuses and Colleges against Trinidad and Tobago.

He was signed by Dambulla Aura for the 2022 Lanka Premier League. On 19 December 2022, he scored his first fifty in his T20 career during 2022 LPL season in a do-or-die contest for Dambulla Aura who were in brink of elimination. He produced an all-round performance both with the bat and ball against Galle Gladiators with a spell of 4/11 in 4 overs coupled with a 30 ball 52 which helped Dambulla Aura to win comfortably against Galle Gladiators. Despite his valiant efforts, Dambulla missed out on playoff qualification after failing to chase 130 runs within 11 overs.

References 

2002 births
Living people
Saint Lucia Kings cricketers
Dambulla Aura cricketers
Combined Campuses and Colleges cricketers